Northern Maalhosmadulu Atoll (code name Raa) is an atoll from the Maldives. It includes Northern Maalhosmadulu Atoll proper and the island of Alifushi.

1. Alifushi and Etthingili (Powell Islands in the Admiralty Chart) stand on a detached reef of their own with very deep waters (no sounding) between this faru and the northern end of the main Atoll.

2. Northern Maalhosmadulu Atoll is 35 miles in length from N to S, and 15 miles across at its broadest part. Its western fringe is composed of a series of round or oval reefs (farus) irregularly placed (a feature peculiar to all the larger Northern Atolls). The centre is heavily dotted with coral patches (giri), some submerged and some awash. The concentration of giri is especially dense towards its SW quarter, close to Kandholhudhu Island (where there is the place most crowded with small reefs and shoals in the whole Maldives), but its narrower northern end is quite clear of reefs. The general depths of the lagoon are from 23 to 27 fathoms.

The capital of Northern Maalhosmadulu Atoll is Ungoofaaru. Recently, the island has been reclaimed up to the edge of the reef in order to provide land for social and economic activities for the growing population.

Alifushi, located at the northern end of the atoll, is an island which has been traditionally famous for its skilled boatbuilding carpenters. It now houses shipyards.

Moresby Channel (Hanikandu)
Hanikandu is the channel between Northern Maalhosmadulu Atoll and "Fasdhūtere" Atoll, beyond its southern border. This channel is also known as Moresby Channel in the honor of Robert Moresby, an almost forgotten captain and draughtsman, who with much patience and hard work charted all the Atolls of the Maldives.

Tourism
Formerly this atoll was off-limits for tourists, but since the late 1990s there was a change in government policy.
The main tourist resort island on Northern Maalhosmadulu Atoll is Meedhupparu.

References
 Divehi Tārīkhah Au Alikameh. Divehi Bahāi Tārikhah Khidmaiykurā Qaumī Markazu. Reprint 1958 edn. Malé 1990. 
 Divehiraajjege Jōgrafīge Vanavaru. Muhammadu Ibrahim Lutfee. G.Sōsanī.
 Xavier Romero-Frias, The Maldive Islanders, A Study of the Popular Culture of an Ancient Ocean Kingdom. Barcelona 1999.

Atolls of the Maldives

dv:މާޅޮސްމަޑުލު އުތުރުބުރި